Artanema fimbriatum, OR koala bells, is a short lived herbaceous plant found in eastern Australia. Growing to one metre tall. The habitat is moist sites and on hillsides, in areas of relatively high rainfall.

References

Linderniaceae
Flora of New South Wales
Flora of Queensland
Ornamental plants